Planocephalosaurus is an extinct genus of rhynchocephalian. Fossils of the genus were found in the Tecovas Formation of Texas and the Magnesian Conglomerate of England.

Planocephalosaurus was one of the first sphenodonts and bore a strong resemblance to the extant tuatara, albeit much smaller, at only  in length. The creature is presumed to have fed on large invertebrates and small vertebrates.

Dentition
Planocephalosaurus exhibits very interesting dentition. Initially, it was believed to have been attached to the bone via acrodont tooth implantation, however, after this specimen was exposed to X-radiography it was determined that this animal has a combination of different tooth implantation types. Similar to another rhynchocephalian, Diphydontosaurus, it possesses acrodont teeth in the posterior portion of the jaw, and pleurodont dentition in the anterior portion. Planocephalosaurus's teeth were also fused with the cartilage, unlike its only extant relative the tuatara.

References

Triassic lepidosaurs
Sphenodontia
Late Triassic reptiles of Europe
Prehistoric reptile genera